Bishop Kishore Kumar Kujur is the current serving bishop of the Roman Catholic Diocese of Rourkela, India.

Early life and education 
Kujur was born on 6 January 1964 in Gaibira, Odisha, India. He studied at Saint Francis de Sales College. He joined the Minor Seminary in Sambalpur and than St. John's Regional Seminary. He completed his studies in philosophy at St. Charles Seminary, Nagpur. He completed his studies in theology from the Khristo Jyoti Mohavidyaloyo, Sason. He has also acquired a Bachelor of Arts degree and a Licentiate from Pontifical Biblical Institute and a Doctorate in Sacred Scripture from Pontifical University of Saint Thomas Aquinas.

Priesthood 
On 7 February 1993, Kujur was ordained a catholic priest for the Roman Catholic Diocese of Sambalpur.

Episcopate 
Kujur was appointed bishop of the Roman Catholic Diocese of Rourkela on 26 July 2013 by Pope Francis and consecrated a bishop by Telesphore Placidus Cardinal Toppo on 29 September 2013.

His episcopal motto is : THE MYSTERY OF FAITH

See also 
 List of Catholic bishops of India
 Roman Catholic Diocese of Rourkela

References 

1964 births
Living people
Bishops appointed by Pope Francis
People from Odisha
Pontifical University of Saint Thomas Aquinas alumni
Pontifical Biblical Institute alumni
21st-century Roman Catholic bishops in India